Laurence Leamer (born October 30, 1941) is an American author and journalist.  Leamer is a former Ford Fellow in International Development at the University of Oregon and a former International Fellow at Columbia University.  He is regarded as an expert on the Kennedy family and has appeared in numerous media outlets discussing American politics.  Leamer has also written best-selling biographies of other Americans, including Johnny Carson, the Reagan family, and Arnold Schwarzenegger. He has also written a book about Donald Trump's historical resort, Mar-a-Lago. His most recent book, Capote's Women, was a national bestseller.  It is being made into an eight-part series starring Naomi Watts and directed by Gus Van Sant.

Biography
Leamer was born in Chicago and later moved to upstate New York with his family where he attended Vestal Central High School.  He attended Antioch College where he spent a year in France, studied at the Université de Besançon, and worked in a factory.  He received his B.A. in History from Antioch in 1964.  After his graduation, Leamer joined the Peace Corps and was stationed in the mountains of Nepal.  When he returned home, Leamer studied both at the University of Oregon and the Columbia University School of Journalism, where he graduated second in his class in 1969 while being named a Pulitzer International Fellow.

After finishing at Columbia, Leamer worked as an associate editor at Newsweek before turning to writing magazine articles for a range of publications, including Harper's, The New York Times Magazine, and Playboy.  During this period, Leamer worked in a coal mine in West Virginia, while researching an article.  During the Indo-Pakistani War of 1971, he was the only journalist to live in a Bengali hotel in Dacca and travel to remote areas of the newborn Bangladesh.  His article in Harper's won a citation from the Overseas Press Club for "Best Magazine Reporting".

Work
Leamer's writings on the Kennedy family have achieved considerable popularity: for instance, The Kennedy Women was the main selection of the Book of the Month Club and reached number two on the New York Times Best Seller list.  His other two Kennedy biographies The Kennedy Men and The Kennedy Women were also New York Times bestsellers.

He has been interviewed by NBC Nightly News, The New York Times, CNN and NPR to lend his expertise to matters concerning the Kennedys, Ronald Reagan, and American politics.  In the period following the death of John F. Kennedy, Jr., Leamer served as the on-air consultant for MSNBC's coverage of the plane crash and subsequent funeral.  He again served as a consultant during the coverage of former President Ronald Reagan's funeral.

Leamer has also written a biography of Johnny Carson titled King of the Night, which spent over six weeks on the New York Times Best Seller list.  In writing his novel Assignment, Leamer lived in Peru for two years to research the cocaine trade.  He again immersed himself in his topic when he moved to Nashville to research the business and lifestyle of country music and its many stars for Three Chords and the Truth.  Each of the books were lauded for the depth of their research.  Leamer's work on the life of famed mountaineer Willi Unsoeld was purchased by Robert Redford's production company to be turned into a film  that remains in the development stages. His 2013 book The Price of Justice is the story of two Pittsburgh lawyers and their decade and a half struggle against the most powerful coal baron in American history. It involves allegations concerning the deaths of 31 miners, the poisoning of the water of hundreds of people, and of judicial corruption in the West Virginia Supreme Court and a landmark decision in the United States Supreme Court. The book won the Peace Corps Writers award for the best nonfiction book of 2013.  So did Leamer's 2016 book The Lynching, about the Klan murder of Michael Donald.  Leamer's 2019 book Mar-a-Lago: Inside the Gates of Power at Donald Trump's Presidential Palace was controversial and got Leamer thrown out of Mar-a-Lago for life. His latest book, ″Capote's Women: A True Story of Love, Betrayal, and a Swan Song for an Era,″ was a national bestseller.

Personal life
Leamer is married to Vesna Obradovic, who assists him with the research for his books.  The author has one daughter, Daniela, and two grandchildren.  The couple maintain residences in Palm Beach, Florida and Washington, D.C.  Leamer's brother, Edward, is an economics professor at UCLA, the Chauncey J. Medberry Chair in Management, and director of the UCLA Anderson Forecast.  His other brother, Robert, is an attorney and executive vice president of a Brooklyn-based long-term care health system.

Books

The Paper Revolutionaries: The Rise of the Underground Press -  1972
Playing for Keeps in Washington - 1977
Assignment - 1979
Ascent: The Spiritual and Physical Quest of Willi Unsoeld - 1982
Make-Believe: The Story of Nancy and Ronald Reagan - 1983
As Time Goes By: The Life of Ingrid Bergman - 1986
King of the Night: The Life of Johnny Carson - 1989
The Kennedy Women: The Saga of an American Family - 1994
Three Chords and the Truth: Hope, Heartbreak, and Changing Fortunes in Nashville - 1997
The Kennedy Men 1901-1963: The Laws of the Father - 2001
Sons of Camelot: The Fate of an American Dynasty- 2004
Fantastic: The Life of Arnold Schwarzenegger - 2005
Madness Under the Royal Palms: Love and Death Behind the Gates of Palm Beach - 2009
The Price of Justice: A True Story of Corruption and Greed in Coal Country - 2013
The Lynching: The Epic Courtroom Battle That Brought Down the Klan - 2016
The President's Butler - 2016
Mar-A-Lago: Inside the Gates of Power at Donald Trump's Presidential Palace - 2019
Capote's Women: A True Story of Love, Betrayal, and a Swan Song for an Era - 2021

References

External links
Homepage of Laurence Leamer

American biographers
American male journalists
American political consultants
American political writers
Antioch College alumni
Columbia University fellows
University of Oregon fellows
Peace Corps volunteers
Writers from New York (state)
Journalists from Washington, D.C.
1941 births
Living people
People from Vestal, New York
American male biographers